Kavuma David Ssemujju (born 11 November 1992) is a Ugandan boxer. He competed in the men's middleweight event at the 2020 Summer Olympics.

References

External links

1992 births
Living people
Ugandan male boxers
Olympic boxers of Uganda
Boxers at the 2020 Summer Olympics
Place of birth missing (living people)
African Games silver medalists for Uganda
African Games medalists in boxing
Competitors at the 2019 African Games